Trevor Geer is a former motorcycle speedway rider, active in the 1970s and 1980s.

Career
Geer raced for the Eastbourne Eagles in the early seventies, before transferring to the Oxford Rebels. He and Ole Olsen came second in the Radio Oxford Best Pairs in 1974. He started his full-time British League career with Oxford in 1975 and was part of the Midland Cup winning team. When the city's Cowley Stadium was threatened with closure, Geer and other team members left to form the White City Rebels.

After retiring, he became the team manager for the Eastbourne Eagles.

References

British speedway riders
Eastbourne Eagles riders
Oxford Rebels riders
White City Rebels riders
Reading Racers riders
Wembley Lions riders
Oxford Cheetahs riders
Living people
People from Polegate
1953 births